Coryptilum is a genus of moths belonging to the family Tineidae. It was described by Philipp Christoph Zeller in 1839.

The species of this genus are dayflying moths of brilliant coloration. They are found from India to the Solomon islands.

Species
Coryptilum klugii Zeller
Coryptilum luteum Diakonoff, 1968
Coryptilum rutilella (Walker, 1869)
Coryptilum woodfordi

References

Myrmecozelinae